America is an American lifestyle and variety talk show that aired weekday afternoons in syndication during the 1985-86 television season. The program, which emanated from Hollywood, California, premiered on September 16, 1985, and was initially hosted by Stuart Damon, Sarah Purcell, and McLean Stevenson with Charlie O'Donnell announcing.

America was a production of Paramount Domestic Television, who also distributed the series. The program was recorded on the Paramount Pictures studio lot in Hollywood.

Format
Each show began with O'Donnell saying "good afternoon and welcome to America," then giving the date and a rundown of the topics covered by the show in the sixty minutes to come. After that, the hosts were introduced and the show began. Feature stories included focuses on people, places, and trends, as well as an interview segment with a celebrity. Some stories were presented by reporters working for the affiliate stations; for example, the December 18, 1985, episode featured a story about a Little Rock, Arkansas, girl in need of a liver transplant that was presented by then-KATV reporter Greg Hurst.

Ratings
Paramount sold America to stations from various ownership groups. This included all five of CBS' owned and operated stations (WCBS-TV in New York, WCAU-TV in Philadelphia, WBBM-TV in Chicago, KMOX-TV in St. Louis, and KCBS-TV in Los Angeles), ABC O&O KGO-TV in San Francisco, and stations belonging to Paramount's production partner for America, Post-Newsweek Stations, including their largest affiliate WDIV-TV in Detroit. Paramount's major selling point was the time slots they were trying to place America in; the company felt that the focus on lifestyle and human interest stories would serve as a perfect lead in for the stations' early news broadcasts.

Despite Paramount's best efforts, America met with low ratings from the start. 1985 was a big year for syndicated programming as stations had many options to choose from to fill slots in their schedules. This led to an overabundance of choices and not enough places for them to go; new shows that were able to get slots like Paramount wanted for America often found themselves facing off against a popular talk show like The Phil Donahue Show, or perhaps another first run syndicated program like the popular game show Wheel of Fortune or courtroom shows like The People's Court that had been established as hits.

As the season reached November, the ratings for America were not improving and the stations that were airing it as a lead-in for their early evening newscasts were seeing those ratings fall as well. Stuart Damon left the series at the end of the month, and the CBS O&O’s that were airing it were no longer carrying it in late afternoons.

Then, on December 13, 1985, CBS announced it was dropping America from all five of its stations. Six days later, after more stations had followed suit, Paramount and Post-Newsweek announced that the series was being cancelled. McLean Stevenson was let go upon the announcement, and Sarah Purcell was left to carry the show alone until the final episode aired.

On January 3, 1986, the eightieth and final episode of America aired on the remaining stations that had kept it. Purcell closed the show by thanking the viewers for their support and the show closed with a montage of clips of the show’s staff set to “Glory Days” by Bruce Springsteen.

References

External links

1985 American television series debuts
1986 American television series endings
Television series by CBS Studios
1980s American television talk shows
English-language television shows